Herbstadt is a municipality in the district of Rhön-Grabfeld in Bavaria in Germany. It includes the following villages: Breitensee, Herbstadt, Ottelmannshausen and a hamlet: Dörfleshof.

References

Rhön-Grabfeld